The 2010–11 Tennessee Volunteers basketball team represented the University of Tennessee in the 2010–11 NCAA Division I men's basketball season. This was the sixth season for Bruce Pearl as the Volunteers' head coach. The team, a member of the Eastern Division of the Southeastern Conference, played its home games at Thompson-Boling Arena. They were the champions of the 2011 NIT Season Tip-Off. They finished the season 19–15, 8–8 in SEC play and lost in the quarterfinals of the 2011 SEC men's basketball tournament to Florida. They received an at-large bid in the 2011 NCAA Division I men's basketball tournament where they lost in the second round to Michigan.

On March 21, 2011, Pearl was fired by the school for lying to NCAA investigators on recruiting violations.

2010–11 roster

Class of 2010 Signees

Schedule

|-
!colspan=9 style=| Exhibition

|-
!colspan=9 style=| Regular season

|-
!colspan=9 style=| SEC tournament

|-
!colspan=9 style=|  NCAA tournament

References

Tennessee
Tennessee Volunteers basketball seasons
Tennessee
Volunteers
Volunteers